James L. Ziemer (born 1951) is the retired Chief Executive Officer and President of Harley-Davidson Motor Company. Ziemer became the company's CEO on April 30, 2005. Before assuming his position, he had previously served as Vice President and Chief Financial Officer of the Company from December 1990 to April 2005 and President of The Harley-Davidson Foundation, Inc. from 1993 to March 6, 2006. He retired from his position in April 2009, ending his 40-year career with the company.

He was elected to Textron Board of Directors  and appointed by George W. Bush as a member of the Advisory Committee for Trade Policy and Negotiations  in 2007.

He graduated from the University of Wisconsin–Milwaukee with a bachelor's degree in Business Administration in 1975 and an executive MBA in 1986.  Currently, he lives in Milwaukee and spends his summer months in New Buffalo, Michigan with his family.

References

External links
James L. Ziemer at Harley-Davidson's website

American chief executives of manufacturing companies
American manufacturing businesspeople
Harley-Davidson executives
University of Wisconsin–Milwaukee alumni
Living people
1951 births
American chief financial officers